3001: A Laced Odyssey is the debut studio album by the American hip hop group Flatbush Zombies. The album was released on March 11, 2016, through their own independent record label, Glorious Dead Recordings & Warner Music's ADA.

Background
The album's artwork was designed by David Nakayama, a comic book artist who has worked on Marvel Adventures, Deadpool, Big Hero 6 and more. 
The album includes guest appearances from Anthony Flammia and Diamante, and is entirely produced by Erick "The Architect" Elliott.

Singles
On February 5, 2016, the first single from the album, titled "Bounce", was released. The official music video for the single was released on February 8. On March 10, 2016, the group released the second single "This Is It", followed shortly after by the official music video.

Critical reception

3001: A Laced Odyssey received critical acclaim. At Metacritic, which assigns a normalized rating out of 100 to reviews from mainstream publications, the album received an average score of 80 based on 7 reviews.

Commercial performance
The album sold 28,000 copies in the first week, debuting at number 10 on the US Billboard 200 chart.

Track listing
All tracks produced by Erick Arc Elliott.

Personnel
Credits adapted from AllMusic

Meechy Darko – Group Member
Diamante – Featured Artist
Erick Arc Elliott – Booklet, Engineer, Group Member, Producer
Anthony Flammia – Featured Artist
Flatbush Zombies – Primary Artist
Joel Gutman – Mixing
Zombie Juice – Group Member
Cherdsak Moeikunmak – Booklet
David Nakayama – Cover Art
P.T.a. – Cover Art
Bruce Templeton – Mastering

Charts

Weekly charts

Year-end charts

References

2016 debut albums
Flatbush Zombies albums